The India Open is a table tennis tournament held in India. It featured on the ITTF World Tour schedule in 2017.

History

The India Open was first included on the ITTF Pro Tour schedule in 2007, and featured again in 2009 and 2010. 

In August 2016 it was announced that the India Open would make its return as part of the revamped ITTF World Tour schedule in 2017. This was the first time the event had been included on the tour since it was rebranded as the ITTF World Tour in 2012. In May 2017, the India Open was not included on the schedule announced for the 2018 tour.

Germany's Dimitrij Ovtcharov is the most successful player in the tournament's history, having won the men's singles title in 2010 and 2017.

Champions

ITTF Pro Tour, 2007–2010

ITTF World Tour, 2017

See also
Asian Table Tennis Union

References

External links
International Table Tennis Federation

ITTF World Tour
Table tennis competitions
Recurring sporting events established in 2007